Air Marshal Sir Douglas Griffith Morris,  (3 December 1908 – 26 March 1990) was a Royal Air Force officer who became Air Officer Commanding-in-Chief of Fighter Command.

RAF career
Educated at St John's College in Johannesburg, Morris joined the Royal Air Force in 1930. He served in the Second World War as Officer Commanding No. 406 Squadron and then as Station Commander RAF North Weald before being appointed Officer Commanding No. 132 Wing and finishing the war as Senior Air Service Officer at Headquarters No. 84 Group.

He became Senior Air Service Officer at the Headquarters of the Second Tactical Air Force in 1955 and was then made Assistant Chief of the Air Staff (Air Defence) in 1957. He was appointed Chief of Staff at Headquarters Allied Air Forces Central Europe in 1960 and Air Officer Commanding-in-Chief of RAF Fighter Command in 1962 in which capacity he visited India and Aden before he retired in 1966.

In 1967 he carried out a review of the Air Training Corps recommending that it be re-organised on a regional basis.

References

 

1908 births
1990 deaths
Alumni of St John's College (Johannesburg)
Commanders of the Order of the British Empire
Commanders of the Order of Orange-Nassau
Companions of the Distinguished Service Order
Knights Commander of the Order of the Bath
Recipients of the Distinguished Flying Cross (United Kingdom)
Royal Air Force air marshals
Royal Air Force personnel of World War II
British expatriates in South Africa